Verdeh (also Romanized as Vardeh; also known as Verdī and Virdāi) is a village in Khoshkrud Rural District, in the Central District of Zarandieh County, Markazi Province, Iran. At the 2006 census, its population was 562, in 163 families.

References 

Populated places in Zarandieh County